Rasool Ellore Reddy (born 8 October 1964), also known as Rasool, is an Indian cinematographer, screenwriter, and director known for his works in Telugu, and Hindi films. He is the brother-in-law and cousin of noted cinematographers, S. Gopal Reddy and Sameer Reddy, respectively. He is known for his works in films such as Gaayam, Gulabi, Chitram, and others. He made his debut as a director with the romantic comedy, Okariki Okaru. He has garnered three state Nandi Awards.

Filmography

Awards
Nandi Awards
 Nandi Award for Best Cinematographer – Gaayam (1993).
 Nandi Award for Best Cinematographer – Nuvvu Nenu (2001).
 Nandi Award for Best Debut Director – Okariki Okaru (2003).

References

External links

1968 births
Living people
Telugu film directors
Writers from Rajahmundry
Nandi Award winners
Cinematographers from Andhra Pradesh
Telugu film cinematographers
Telugu screenwriters
20th-century Indian photographers
21st-century Indian photographers
21st-century Indian film directors
Film directors from Andhra Pradesh
Screenwriters from Andhra Pradesh